Beat Stegmeier (born 11 October 1962) is a Swiss sailor. He competed in the Star event at the 1992 Summer Olympics.

References

External links
 

1962 births
Living people
Swiss male sailors (sport)
Olympic sailors of Switzerland
Sailors at the 1992 Summer Olympics – Star
Place of birth missing (living people)